The Imperial Russian Army in June 1812 consisted of three main armies and other military formations. The Commander in Chief of the Army was Emperor Alexander I.

First Western Army
General of the Infantry Prince Michael Andreas Barclay de Tolly
 1st Infantry Corps: Lieutenant General Count Peter Wittgenstein
 5th Infantry Division: Major General Gregor von Berg
 1st Brigade
 Sievsk Grenadier and Kaluga Infantry Regiments
 2nd Brigade
 Perm and Mohilev Infantry Regiments
 3rd Brigade
 23rd and 24th Jäger Regiment
 14th Infantry Division: Major General Ivan Sazonov
 1st Brigade
 Tula and Navaginsk Infantry Regiments
 2nd Brigade
 Riga and Tenginsk Infantry Regiments
 3rd Brigade
 25th and 26th Jäger Regiment
 Corps Artillery: Nine companies, two pontoon and one pioneer companies
 1st Cavalry Division: Major General Pyotr Kahovskiy
 1st and 5th Cavalry Brigades
 Riga and Jamburg Dragoon Regiments, Grodno Hussar Regiment and three Cossack Regiments
 2nd Infantry Corps: Lieutenant General Karl Gustav von Baggovut
 4th Infantry Division: Major General Duke Eugene of Württemberg
 1st Brigade
 Kremenchug and Minsk Infantry Regiments
 2nd Brigade
 Tobolsk and Volhynia Infantry Regiments
 3rd Brigade
 4th and 34th Jäger Regiments
 17th Infantry Division: Major General Zakhar Dmitrievich Olsufiev
 1st Brigade
 Ryazan and Byelosersk Infantry Regiments
 2nd Brigade
 Brest and Wilmannstrand Infantry Regiments
 3rd Brigade
 30th and 48th Jäger Regiments
 Corps Artillery: Seven companies
 Elizabethgrad Hussar Regiment
 3rd Infantry Corps: Lieutenant General Nikolai Tuchkov
 1st Grenadier Division: Major General Count Pavel Stroganov
 1st Brigade
 Life Grenadiers and Arakcheyev Grenadier Regiments
 2nd Brigade
 Pavlov and Ekaterinslav Grenadier Regiments
 3rd Grenadier Brigade
 Saint Petersburg and Tauride Grenadier Regiments
 3rd Infantry Division: Major General Pyotr Konovnitsin
 1st Brigade
 Reval and Muromsk Infantry Regiments
 2nd Brigade
 Tchernigov and Kaporie Infantry Regiments
 3rd Brigade
 20th and 21st Jäger Regiments
 Corps Artillery: Eight companies
 Life Guard Cossack Regiment and one Cossack regiment
 4th Infantry Corps: Lieutenant General Count Pavel Shuvalov
 11th Infantry Division: Major General Nikolai Bakhmetiev
 1st Brigade
 Kexholm and Pernau Infantry Regiments
 2nd Brigade
 Polotsk and Yeletz Infantry Regiments
 3rd Brigade
 1st and 33rd Jäger Regiments 
 23rd Infantry Division: Major General Alexey Bakhmetiev
 Corps Artillery: Six companies
 5th Reserve Guards Infantry Corps: Grand Duke Constantine Pavlovich of Russia
 Guard Infantry Division: Major General Aleksey Petrovich Yermolov
 1st Guards Infantry Brigade
 Preobrazhensky and Semyonovsky Life Guard Regiments
 2nd Guards Infantry Brigade
 Izmaylovsky and Lithuanian Lifeguard Regiments
 3rd Guards Infantry Brigade
 Finland and Lifeguard Jäger Regiments
 1st Combined Grenadier Division 
 26 combined grenadier battalions
 Corps Artillery: Four foot and two horse companies, one pioneer company 
 1st Cuirassier Division Major General Nikolay Depreradovich
 1st Cuirassier Brigade
 Chevalier Guard and Life Guard Horse Regiments
 2nd Cuirassier Brigade
 Emperor Life Guard, Empress Life Guard and Astrakhan Cuirassier Regiments
 6th Infantry Corps: General of infantry Dmitry Dokhturov
 7th Infantry Division: Lieutenant General Peter Mikhailovich Kaptzevich
 1st Brigade
 Moscow and Pskov Infantry Regiments
 2nd Brigade
 Libau and Sophia Infantry Regiments
 3rd Brigade
 11th and 36th Jäger Regiments
 7th Divisional Artillery
 24th Infantry Division: Major General Pyotr Likhachyov
 1st Brigade
 Ufa and Schirvan Infantry Regiments
 2nd Brigade
 Butirsk and Tomsk Infantry Regiments
 3rd Brigade
 19th and 40th Jäger Regiments
 Corps Artillery: Seven companies 
 Sumy Hussar Regiment
 1st Reserve Cavalry Corps: General aide-de-camp Fyodor Uvarov
 1st Guards Cavalry Brigade
 Life Guard Dragoon, Life Guard Hussar and Life Guard Uhlan Regiments
 Brigade
 Kazan and Niezhin Dragoon Regiments
 Corps Artillery: One company
 2nd Reserve Cavalry Corps: General aide-de-camp Baron Fyodor Korf
 6th Cavalry Brigade
 Pskov and Moscow Dragoon Regiments
 7th Cavalry Brigade
 Kargopol and Ingermanland Dragoon Regiments
 Brigade
 Isum Hussar and Polish Uhlan Regiments 
 Corps Artillery: One company
 3rd Reserve Cavalry Corps: Major General Count Peter Petrovich Pahlen
 Brigade
 Courland and Orenburg Dragoon Regiments
 Brigade
 Siberia and Irkutsk Dragoon Regiments
 Brigade
 Mariopol Hussar Regiment
 Corps Artillery: One company
 Artillery Reserve: Count Kutaisov
 21 foot and five horse artillery companies
 Flying Cossack Corps: General of Cavalry Count Matvei Platov
Source: 
Source:

Second Western Army
General of the Infantry Prince Pyotr Bagration
 7th Infantry Corps: Lieutenant General Nikolay Raevsky
 12th Infantry Division: Major General Illarion Vasilievich Vasilchokov
 1st Brigade
 Smolensk and Narva Infantry Regiments
 2nd Brigade
 Alexopol and New Ingermanland Infantry Regiments
 3rd Brigade
 6th and 41st Jäger Regiments
 26th Infantry Division: Major General Ivan Paskevich
 1st Brigade
 Ladoga and Poltava Infantry Regiments
 2nd Brigade
 Nishegorod and Orel Infantry Regiments
 3rd Brigade
 3rd, 5th and 42nd Jäger Regiments
 Corps Artillery: Unknown 
 8th Infantry Corps: Lieutenant General Mikhail Borozdin
 2nd Grenadier Division: Major General Prince Karl von Mecklenburg
 1st Grenadier Brigade
 Crimea and Moscow Grenadier Regiments
 2nd Grenadier Brigade
 Astrakhan and Fanagoria Grenadier Regiments
 3rd Grenadier Brigade
 Siberia and Little Russia Grenadier Regiments
 27th Infantry Division: Major General Dmitri Petrovich Neverovsky
 1st Brigade
 Odessa and Zhitomir (or Tarnopol) Infantry Regiments
 2nd Brigade
 Vilna and Simbirsk Infantry Regiments
 3rd Brigade
 49th and 50th Jäger Regiments
 3rd Grenadier Division
 22 combined grenadier battalions
 Corps Artillery: Five companies
 2nd Cuirassier Division: Major General Ilya Mikhailovich Duka
 2nd Cavalry Brigade
 Ekaterinoslav and Military Order Cuirassier Regiments
 3rd Cavalry Brigade
 Gluchov, Little Russia and Novgorod Cuirassier Regiments
 4th Reserve Cavalry Corps: Major General Count Karl Sivers
 12th Cavalry Brigade
 Kharkov and Chernigov Dragoon Regiments
 13th Cavalry Brigade
 Kiev and New Russian Dragoon Regiments
 Cavalry Brigade
 Achtyrsk Hussar and Lithuanian Uhlan Regiments
 Corps Artillery: One company
 Cossack detachment: Major General Ivan K. Krasnov
Source: 
Source:

3rd Reserve Observation Army 
General of cavalry Alexander Tormasov
 Infantry Corps: General of Infantry Sergei Kamensky
18th Infantry Division
 1st Brigade
 Vladimir and Tambov Infantry Regiments
 2nd Brigade
 Kostroma and Dnieper Infantry Regiments
 3rd Brigade
 28th and 32nd Jäger Regiments
 Combined Grenadier Division
 18 combined grenadier battalions
 Corps Artillery: Four companies
Pavlograd Hussar Regiment
 Infantry Corps: Lieutenant General Yevgeni Ivanovich Markov
 9th Infantry Division
 1st Brigade
 Nascheburg and Yakutsk Infantry Regiments
 2nd Brigade
 Apscheron and Riazhsk Infantry Regiments
 3rd Brigade
 10th and 38th Jäger Regiments
 15th Infantry Division
 1st Brigade
 Koslov and Vitebsk Infantry Regiments
 2nd Brigade
 Kura and Kolyvan Infantry Regiments
 3rd Brigade
 13th and 14th Jäger Regiments
 Corps Artillery: Seven companies
 Alexandria Hussar Regiment
 Infantry Corps: Lieutenant General Baron Fabian Gottlieb von Osten-Sacken
 36th Infantry Division
 Unknown composition
 11th Cavalry Division
 Lubny Hussar Regiment, other units unknown
 Corps Artillery: Two companies
 Cavalry Corps: Major General Count Charles de Lambert
 5th Cavalry Division
 15th Cavalry Brigade
 Starodub and Tver Dragoon Regiments
 16th Cavalry Brigade
 Arsamass and Zhitomir Dragoon Regiments
 17th Cavalry Brigade
 Vladimir, Taganrog and Serpuchov Dragoon Regiments and Tartar Uhlan Regiment
 Nine Cossack regiments
Source:

Danube Army
The Danube Army, commanded by Admiral Pavel Chichagov, included the:

 1st Corps (General of cavalry Count Andrault de Langeron); made up of the:
 22nd Infantry Division
 2nd Corps (Lieutenant General Count Pyotr Essen);
 3rd Corps (Lieutenant General Alexander Voinov);
 4th Corps (Lieutenant General Andreas Burchard Friedrich von Saß (Andrey Pavlovich Zass)); made up of the:
 8th Infantry Division
 7th Cavalry Division
 Reserve of the Army (Lieutenant General Ivan Sabaneev)

Separate Corps and detachments
Riga Corps (Lieutenant General Magnus Gustav (Ivan) von Essen)

Finland Corps 
The Finland Corps consisted of the following units, under the command of Lieutenant General (Faddey) Fabian Steinheil:

 6th Infantry Division
 1st Brigade
 Bryansk and Nizov Infantry Regiments
 3rd Brigade
 Azov Infantry and 3rd Jager Regiments
 6th Field Artillery Brigade
 6th Heavy and 11th Light Batteries
21st Infantry Division
1st Brigade
 Petrovsk and Podolia Infantry Regiments
2nd Brigade
Neva and Lithuania Infantry Regiments
3rd Brigade
2nd and 44th Jager Regiments
21st Field Artillery Brigade
21st Heavy and 40th Light Batteries
25th Infantry Division
1st Brigade
1st and 2nd Marine Regiments
2nd Brigade
3rd Marine and Voronezh Infantry Regiments
3rd Brigade
31st and 47th Jager Regiments
25th Field Artillery Brigade

 27th Cavalry Brigade
Finland and Mitava Dragoon Regiments
Isaev II, Loshchilin, and Kiselev II Don Cossack Regiments

Other separate units 

1st Reserve Corps (Adjutant General Baron Yegor Meller-Zakomelsky);
 2nd Reserve Corps (Lieutenant General Fyodor Ertell);
Bobruysk detachment (Major General Gavriil Ignatyev);
Smolensk Reserve Corps (General aide-de-camp Baron Ferdinand von Wintzingerode);
Kaluga Reserve Corps (General of infantry Count of Serbian origin Mikhail Miloradovich);
 27th Infantry Division (Major General Dmitry Neverovsky);
Serbian detachment (Major General Nikolai Liders)

See also
 French invasion of Russia
 Grande Armée
 List of Russian commanders in the Patriotic War of 1812

References

External links
  The Russian Army in June 1812 by Aleksandr Podmazo
  The Russian Army of 1812

Conflicts in 1812
Military of the Russian Empire
Napoleonic Wars orders of battle